The Demer is an  long river in eastern Belgium, right tributary of the Dijle. It flows through the Belgian provinces Limburg and Flemish Brabant. Its source is near Tongeren. It flows into the river Dijle in Werchter, Rotselaar municipality.

The most important towns along the Demer are (starting from the source) Bilzen, Hasselt, Diest and Aarschot. Tributaries of the Demer are the rivers Herk, Gete and Velp (all three in Halen).

The name "Demer" comes from the Celtic language words "tam" (dark coloured) and "ara" (water) giving rise to a name meaning "dark coloured river".

References

Rivers of Belgium
Rivers of Limburg (Belgium)
Rivers of Flemish Brabant
Tongeren